Hylesinini is a tribe of crenulate bark beetles in the family Curculionidae. There are at least 20 genera and 80 described species in Hylesinini.

Genera
These 23 genera belong to the tribe Hylesinini:

 Alniphagus Swaine, 1918 i c g b
 Carphobius Blackman, 1943 i c g b
 Carphoborus Eichhoff, 1864 i c g b
 Chaetophloeus Leconte, 1876 i c g b
 Chramesus LeConte, 1868 i c g b
 Cnesinus LeConte, 1868 i c g b
 Dendroctonus Erichson, 1836 i c g b
 Dendrosinus Chapuis, 1869 i c g b
 Hylastes Erichson, 1836 i c g b
 Hylastinus Bedel, 1888 i c g b
 Hylesinus Fabricius, 1801 i c g b
 Hylurgopinus Swaine, 1918 i c g b
 Hylurgops LeConte, 1876 i c g b
 Hylurgus Latreille, 1807 c g b
 Liparthrum Wollaston, 1864 i c g b
 Pagiocerus Eichhoff, 1868 i c g b
 Phloeosinus Chapuis, 1869 i c g b (cedar bark beetles)
 Phloeotribus Latreille, 1804 i c g b
 Polygraphus Erichson, 1836 i c g b
 Pseudohylesinus Swaine, 1917 i c g b
 Scierus LeConte, 1876 i c g b
 Tomicus Latreille, 1802 c g b
 Xylechinus Chapuis, 1869 i c g b

Data sources: i = ITIS, c = Catalogue of Life, g = GBIF, b = Bugguide.net

References

Further reading

External links

 

Scolytinae